Here's Looking At Me! is a compilation music album by Alvin and the Chipmunks. It was released on CD and cassette by Sony in 1994 and was one of two 35th anniversary compilation albums by The Chipmunks (the other one being 1993's The Chipmunks' 35th Birthday Party), despite being released 36 years after the group's debut. Various tracks on Here's Looking At Me! were re-recordings and various changes to previous recordings were made, notably the omittance of Billy Ray Cyrus' speaking role in "Achy Breaky Heart" from Chipmunks in Low Places.

Track listing 

 "We're the Chipmunks (Alvin and the Chipmunks Theme)"
 "Witch Doctor"
 "Girls Just Want to Have Fun - with The Chipettes"
 "Let's Go" (re-recorded version)
 "Uptown Girl"
 "Beat It"
 "Wooly Bully"
 "Leader of the Pack"
 "The Chipmunk Song (Christmas Don't Be Late)"
 "Express Yourself - with The Chipettes"
 "On the Road Again"
 "Achy Breaky Heart"

Alvin and the Chipmunks albums
1994 compilation albums
Columbia Records albums